The Arboretum des Pouyouleix is a private arboretum specializing in oaks (Quercus) located in Saint-Jory-de-Chalais, Dordogne, Aquitaine, France, and open by appointment only. The arboretum was established on a  site by Beatrice Chasse and Gerard Lionet in 2003. The arboretum received National Collection status for the genus Quercus in 2012. Today the collection comprises nearly 300 botanic species of oak, and is said to be one of the largest oak collections in France.

See also 
 List of botanical gardens in France

References 
 Arboretum Des Pouyouleix official website (English and French)
 Journal Officiel entry (French)
 "Globe-trotting acorn hunter stalks Daniel Island's elusive Quercus similis", Daniel Island News, October 9, 2008
 Gralon.net entry (French)
 Perigord Vert entry (French)
 Pays de Jumilhac
  Guide Touristique - Pays de Jumilhac (French)

External links 
 arboretumpouyouleix.com

Pouyouleix, Arboretum des
Pouyouleix, Arboretum des